Lipinia occidentalis is a species of skink found in Papua New Guinea.

References

Lipinia
Reptiles described in 2000
Taxa named by Rainer Günther